Floodland is a 2022 city-building game developed by Vile Monarch and published by Ravenscourt. It was released on November 15, 2022 for Microsoft Windows and macOS. In the game, players control a civilization of people as they attempt to survive in a devastated world flooded as a result of climate change. The game received generally positive reviews on release.

Gameplay
Floodland is a city-building game, where players control a colony of people attempting to survive in a world consumed by flooding caused by climate change. The player can choose between four different types of "clans", which all have their own unique advantages and outlooks on life. The settlers that the player has can be assigned to construct buildings, collect resources, and perform expeditions for supplies. As the player progresses, they can encounter other clans that have different worldviews and priorities than their own people. The player must introduce laws to ensure amicable relations between clans, and prevent hostility, which can cause crime and unrest. Stores of food and water must be managed by the player as they research new technologies and create relationships between clans.

Reception

According to the review aggregator website Metacritic, Floodland received "generally favorable reviews" for its PC versions. GamesRadar liked the story, city building elements, and UI, but was frustrated by the number of software bugs on launch. Rock Paper Shotgun enjoyed how clans interacted and integrated with each other, but felt as though the player would spend too much time waiting for new technologies to be researched. The Games Machine enjoyed the narrative, and lauded the game as less challenging than other city building video games such as Frostpunk.

References

City-building games
2022 video games
Windows games
MacOS games
Single-player video games
Video games developed in Poland